Neustadt am Main (officially: Neustadt a. Main) is a community in the Main-Spessart district in the Regierungsbezirk of Lower Franconia (Unterfranken) in Bavaria, Germany and a member of the Verwaltungsgemeinschaft Lohr am Main (municipal administrative association).

Geography

Location 
Neustadt am Main lies on both banks of the Main river in the Würzburg Region, around 8 km south of the town of Lohr at the foot of the Spessart hills. It is part of the Main-Spessart district in the Regierungsbezirk of Lower Franconia.

The municipal territory stretches quite far into the wooded hills to the west. The highest peak of the Main-Spessart-Kreis is located in Neustadt's territory: the Klosterkuppel at 552 m above sea level. In that area lies the source of the  that flows into the Main near the town.

Out of a total municipal area of around 1,980 hectares, forest accounts for almost 1,600 ha.

Subdivisions

The community has the following Gemarkungen (traditional rural cadastral areas):  (on the left bank of the river), Neustadt am Main (on the right bank). The two Ortsteile are linked by a pedestrian bridge across the Main (built 1970-71).

Neighbouring communities
From the north, clockwise: 
 Lohr am Main
 Steinfeld
 Roden
 Marktheidenfeld
 Rothenfels
  (Gemeindefreies Gebiet)
  (Gemeindefreies Gebiet)

History 

Kloster Neustadt, a Benedictine monastery was first mentioned (Niwenstat) in a document in 768/769, when Megingoz, Bishop of Würzburg, retired from his post to found a monastery on the Michaelsberg. The monastery was one of the most important in Franconia and monks from Neustadt played a key role in bringing Christianity to the Saxons. The town itself was first mentioned in 889 (Niunstadt).

In the late 10th century, the monastery came under the influence of the Prince-Bishop of Würzburg. The monastery was sacked during the Peasants' War in 1525. The church was rededicated in 1534.

The monastery was rebuilt in 1616 under Bishop Julius Echter, but heavily damaged during the Thirty Years' war in 1635-48. Kloster Neustadt was dissolved in the course of Secularization in 1803. Most of the monastery buildings and the church were destroyed by lightning in 1857.

As part of the Amt of Rothenfels of the Prince-Bishopric (Hochstift) of Würzburg, the community passed with the 1803 Reichsdeputationshauptschluss to the Counts of Löwenstein-Wertheim. After mediatization in 1806 it passed with the Principality of Aschaffenburg in 1814 (by this time the Principality had become a part of the Grand Duchy of Frankfurt) to the Kingdom of Bavaria. In the course of administrative reform in Bavaria, the current community came into being with the Gemeindeedikt ("Municipal Edict") of 1818.

In 1869-79, the parish church was rebuilt. In 1907, what remained of the monastery was taken over by nuns of the "Dominican Order of Saint Catherine of Siena" from South Africa. By 1960, the monastery had been rebuilt.

In 1978 Karl, Fürst zu Löwenstein, gave the Michaelskapelle to the municipality. It was renovated in 1981-89.

Demographics
Within town limits, 1,204 inhabitants were counted in 1970, 1,301 in 1987 and in 2000 1,343.

For year-end 2014, the population statistics show 1,331 inhabitants (of which 97 have a secondary residence here).

Economy
According to official statistics, there were 39 workers on the social welfare contribution rolls (Sozialversicherungspflichtig Beschäftigte) working in producing businesses in 1998. In trade and transport there were 22. In other areas, 39 workers on the social welfare contribution rolls were employed, and 474 such workers worked from home. There were 4 processing businesses. One business was in construction, and furthermore, in 1999, there was one agricultural operation.

Attractions
The parish church, St. Michael und Gertrud, contains several pieces of art from the monastery's past, including grave stones (12th and 15th centuries), a Romanesque baptismal font, paintings and frescos. North of the parish church are the remains of the oldest chapel of St. Peter and St. Paul, dating to Abbot Dietho (786/87).

On the Michaelsberg, southwest of the monastery, stands the Michaelskapelle or St. Michaelskirche (formerly the parish church, when the Benedictine monastery was still in operation, until 1803). According to tradition, the ramparts on which it was built date to Charlemagne's hunting lodge, known as Rohrinlach. Excavations have found structures that support the existence of a Carolingian fortification, or possibly a Pfalz. Only the foundation of the current chapel is early Romanesque (11th century), the rest of the structure dates to 1729-33.

The monastery, Neustadt and Erlach feature some other protected monuments and buildings (see  (German). Notable among these are the outlying Margarethenhof (a 12th-century farmyard with a chapel, built and run by the monastery) and the Forsthaus Aurora, a forester's lodge originally constructed in the time under the Counts of Löwenstein (the current lodge dates from 1936).

Government
Since 2014 Stephan Morgenroth (Bürgerliste) has been the Erster Bürgermeister (mayor).
 
Municipal taxes in 1999 amounted to €587,000 (converted), of which net business taxes amounted to €78,000.

Since 1 May 1978, Neustadt has been a member of the Verwaltungsgemeinschaft Lohr am Main (municipal administrative association). Also at that point, Neustadt and Erlach were merged in the course of Gebietsreform.

Town twinning
Neustadt is a member of the working group Neustadt in Europa, in which 36 towns (as at September 2008) named Neustadt in Germany, Austria, Hungary, the Czech Republic, Poland and Slovakia have linked together. The following places belong to the group:
 Bad Neustadt an der Saale, Rhön-Grabfeld, Bavaria, Germany
 Bergneustadt, Oberbergischer Kreis, North Rhine-Westphalia, Germany

 Breuberg-Neustadt, Odenwaldkreis, Hesse, Germany
 Dunaújváros, Fejér County, Hungary
 Neuenstadt am Kocher, Heilbronn, Baden-Württemberg, Germany
 Neustadt an der Dosse, Ostprignitz-Ruppin, Brandenburg, Germany
 Neustadt, Marburg-Biedenkopf, Hesse, Germany
 Neustadt an der Wied, Neuwied, Rhineland-Palatinate, Germany
 Neustadt/Harz, Nordhausen, Thuringia, Germany
 Neustadt, Vogtlandkreis, Saxony, Germany
 Neustadt, Westerwaldkreis, Rhineland-Palatinate, Germany
 Neustadt am Kulm, Neustadt, Bavaria, Germany
 Neustadt am Main, Main-Spessart, Bavaria, Germany
 Neustadt am Rennsteig, Ilm-Kreis, Thuringia, Germany
 Neustadt am Rübenberge, Hanover, Lower Saxony, Germany
 Neustadt an der Aisch, Neustadt (Aisch)-Bad Windsheim, Bavaria, Germany
 Neustadt an der Donau, Kelheim, Bavaria, Germany
 Neustadtl an der Donau, Amstetten, Lower Austria, Austria
 Neustadt an der Orla, Saale-Orla-Kreis, Thuringia, Germany
 Neustadt (Spree), Bautzen, Saxony, Germany
 Neustadt an der Waldnaab, Neustadt, Bavaria, Germany
 Neustadt an der Weinstraße, Rhineland-Palatinate, Germany
 Neustadt bei Coburg, Coburg, Bavaria, Germany
 Neustadt an der Rems, Rems-Murr-Kreis, Baden-Württemberg, Germany
 Neustadt in Holstein, Ostholstein, Schleswig-Holstein, Germany
 Neustadt in Sachsen, Sächsische Schweiz-Osterzgebirge, Saxony, Germany
 Neustadt, Eichsfeld, Thuringia, Germany
 Neustadt-Glewe, Ludwigslust-Parchim, Mecklenburg-Vorpommern, Germany
 Nové Město na Moravě, Vysočina Region, Czech Republic
 Nové Město nad Metují, Hradec Králové Region, Czech Republic
 Nové Mesto nad Váhom, Trenčín Region, Slovakia
 Nové Město pod Smrkem, Liberec Region, Czech Republic
 Nowe Miasto Lubawskie, Nowe Miasto County, Warmian-Masurian Voivodeship, Poland
 Nowe Miasto nad Pilicą, Grójec County, Masovian Voivodeship, Poland
 Titisee-Neustadt, Breisgau-Hochschwarzwald, Baden-Württemberg, Germany
 Wiener Neustadt, Lower Austria, Austria

Coat of arms 
The community's arms might be described thus: Per pale argent a lowercase uncial N upon which a small cross pattée sable, gules a sword proper waved in pale, point downwards.

The uncial N with the cross on top is the sign that the old Neustadt Monastery, founded about 770 by Bishop of Würzburg Megingoz, used to mark its estate. In 993 the monastery passed to the Princely Electorate (Hochstift) of Würzburg, remaining with that state until Secularization in 1803. Recalling this former allegiance are the tinctures argent and gules (silver and red), those borne by the Electorate. The waved sword was taken from a village court seal from the early 18th century that showed Saint Michael with a sword. The arms have been borne since 1968.

Infrastructure

Transport
Neustadt used to have a station on the discontinued . The road Staatsstrasse 2315 passes through the village.

Education 
In 1999, Neustadt had a kindergarten with 50 places used by 42 children.

References

External links 

 Neustadt-Erlach municipal website 
 Verwaltungsgemeinschaft Lohr am Main website 
 Kloster Neustadt 
 History of Kloster Neustadt at Klöster in Bayern (Haus der Bayerischen Geschichte) 
 Pfarreiengemeinschaft 12 Apostel am Tor zum Spessart (Roman Catholic parish) 
 Neustadt and Erlach fire brigade 

Main-Spessart